Himalayacalamus asper   is a species of flowering plant in the family Poaceae found in Nepal. also called Malingo nigalo in common language.

References

External links

Bambusoideae
Endemic flora of Nepal
Grasses of Asia